Bajanaspis is a genus of  trilobites that has been found in the Edreisk Formation, Kazakhstan, belonging to the Lower Cambrian.

References 

Cambrian trilobites of Asia
Paradoxidoidea
Fossils of Kazakhstan
Fossil taxa described in 1978

Cambrian genus extinctions